Quantitative Discourse Analysis Package (qdap) is an R package for computer assisted qualitative data analysis, particularly quantitative discourse analysis, transcript analysis and natural language processing. Qdap is installable from, and runs within, the R system.

Qdap is a tool for quantitative analysis of qualitative transcripts and therefore provides a bridge between quantitative and qualitative research approaches. It is designed for transcript analysis, but its features overlap with natural language processing and text mining.

Its features include:
 tools for the preparation of transcript data
 frequency counts of sentence types, words, sentences, turns of talk, syllables
 aggregation using grouping variables
 word extracting and visualization
 statistical analysis.

For higher level statistical analysis and visualization of text, qdap is integrated with R and offers integration with other R packages.

Alternatives
  KH Coder (Windows, Linux, macOS) for quantitative content analysis and text mining.

See also
 Computer-assisted qualitative data analysis software

References

External links

qdap manual
qdap developer website
Text Mining First-step Report

Free QDA software
Cross-platform free software
Free R (programming language) software
Science software for macOS
Science software for Linux